The AGS JH22 was a Formula One racing car designed by Christian Vanderpleyn and used by the French AGS team in the 1987 Formula One season.

Background
However, while the JH21C had been fitted with a Motori Moderni turbocharged engine and Pirelli tyres, the JH22 was fitted with a normally-aspirated Ford-Cosworth DFZ V8 engine and Goodyear tyres. It also carried a 1970s-style airbox aft of the fuel tank, although this was replaced with a smaller and more conventional air intake as the season progressed.

As in 1986, AGS chose to enter one car for the season, and so built only two chassis, labeled #32 and #33. Italian shoe and clothing company El Charro continued as the team's main sponsor, and so the car, numbered 14, was painted in a white and red livery with a large rose above the nosecone. Frenchman Pascal Fabre, who had driven for the team in Formula Two in 1982, was signed to drive.

As one of four teams running normally-aspirated engines at the start of the season (the others being Tyrrell, the returning March and newcomers Larrousse), AGS contested the one-off Colin Chapman Trophy in addition to the regular Constructors' Championship, while Fabre contested the drivers' equivalent, the Jim Clark Trophy.

Performance
The JH22 was slow from the outset, and Fabre usually qualified last, at least a second slower than the car immediately in front. However, the car proved reliable on race day, as the Frenchman was classified in eight of the first nine races (albeit at least five laps down in each), his best results being 9th on home soil in France and in Britain.

Fabre also made it to the finish line in Austria, but did not complete enough laps to be classified. But as the entry list expanded with the Osella and Larrousse teams deciding to run a second car and the Coloni team making its F1 debut, making the grid became a great deal harder, and Fabre failed to do so in three of the next four races.

For the final two races of the season in Japan and Australia, the team decided to replace Fabre with Roberto Moreno, appearing in Formula One for the first time since failing to qualify a Lotus at the 1982 Dutch Grand Prix. The Brazilian scraped onto the grid in both races, and in Adelaide took advantage of a large attrition rate to finish 7th, three laps down. But when compatriot Ayrton Senna was disqualified from 2nd for having oversized brake ducts, Moreno was promoted to 6th, scoring his and AGS's first championship point.

At the end of the season, AGS were equal 11th in the Constructors' Championship and third in the Colin Chapman Trophy. Fabre finished fifth in the Jim Clark Trophy with 35 points, while Moreno's result in Adelaide gave him sixth in that competition with four points, as well as equal 19th in the Drivers' Championship.

After Formula One
For , the JH22 was replaced with the JH23. One of the two chassis remains in AGS's historic collection, while the other is on display at the Manoir de l'Automobile in the commune of Lohéac, Brittany.

Complete Formula One results
(key)

Colin Chapman Trophy (for constructors of cars equipped with naturally aspirated engines)
(key)

References

All Formula One race and championship results are taken from  Official Formula One website:
 Results: Fabre, Pascal - 1987 Season. Retrieved on March 27, 2008.
 Results: Moreno, Roberto - 1987 Season. Retrieved on March 27, 2008.

External links
 Black-and-white pit lane photos of the AGS JH22 at the 1987 Hungarian Grand Prix:  AtlasF1 The Nostalgia Forum (post)
 Fabre at the 1987 San Marino Grand Prix: Sutton Images
 Moreno at the 1987 Japanese Grand Prix: Sutton Images

AGS Formula One cars